DMZ is an American dystopian streaming television miniseries created by Roberto Patino, based on the comic book series of the same name by Brian Wood and Riccardo Burchielli, that premiered on HBO Max on March 17, 2022. A portion of the miniseries premiered at SXSW on March 12, 2022.

Premise
Alma Ortega, a NYC medic, becomes a symbol of hope in a demilitarized Manhattan Island while trying to find her son, who wandered off instead of sticking with her during their evacuation from Manhattan during the Second American Civil War.

Cast

Main
 Rosario Dawson as Alma "Zee" Ortega, a medic who spent the last 8 years looking for her son
 Benjamin Bratt as Parco Delgado, a leader of the Spanish Harlem Kings who controls a part of Upper Manhattan and Alma's ex
 Freddy Miyares as Skel, Parco's assassin and Alma's son formerly known as Christian Ortega
 Hoon Lee as Wilson Lin, the leader of Chinatown, Manhattan, who knew Alma before the war
 Jordan Preston Carter as Odi, an orphaned kid inside the DMZ who becomes friends with Alma
 Venus Ariel as Nico, Odi's friend
 Amandla Jahava as Nicole

Recurring
 Mamie Gummer as Rose
 Agam Darshi as Franklin
 Rey Gallegos as Cesar
 Henry G. Sanders as Cedric
 Jade Wu as Susie, Wilson's advisor
 Sydney Park as Tenny, Skel's love interest	
 Juani Feliz as Carmen, Parco's wife
 Nora Dunn as Oona, the woman who controls the water supply
 Rutina Wesley as Athena
In addition, Bryan Gael Guzman co-stars as Christian Ortega, Alma's teenage son in flashbacks.

Episodes

Production

Development
In February 2014, it was announced that Syfy was planning on making a TV series adaptation of the comic with former writers and executive producers Andre Jacquemetton and Maria Jacquemetton, with David Heyman as executive producer for the potential series. On October 1, 2019, it was announced that HBO Max was developing a TV series adaptation of the comic with Ava DuVernay directing the pilot with Roberto Patino writing the pilot and as showrunner the series. It was also announced that DuVernay and Patino would both executive produce under their respective overall deals with Warner Bros. Television.
On November 19, 2020, HBO Max gave DMZ a limited series order of four episodes, with Patino set to write all of the episodes. In July 2021, Ernest Dickerson joined the series as an executive producer and directed three episodes. The series premiered on March 17, 2022.

Casting
On January 22, 2020, Rosario Dawson was cast as Alma. On February 6, 2020, Benjamin Bratt was cast as Parco Delgado. On February 18, 2020, Freddy Miyares was cast as Skel. Upon the limited series order announcement, Hoon Lee and Jordan Preston Carter joined the main cast. On July 12, 2021, Rutina Wesley, Mamie Gummer, Nora Dunn, and Henry G. Sanders were cast in undisclosed capacities while Venus Ariel, Jade Wu, Rey Gallegos, Agam Darshi, and Juani Feliz were cast as series regulars.

Filming
On October 1, 2019, the pilot was scheduled to go into production in early 2020, with filming on the pilot wrapping on March 16, 2020. Filming for the pilot took place in Atlanta. Filming for the rest of the episodes wrapped in 2021.

Reception
On review aggregator website Rotten Tomatoes, the limited series holds a 50% approval rating based on 14 critic reviews, with an average rating of 5.9/10. The website's critics consensus reads, "DMZ takes an explosive premise and lets it fizzle, although a commanding Benjamin Bratt tries his best to ignite some sparks in this uneven dystopian drama." On Metacritic, the miniseries has a score of 58 out of 100, based on 10 critics, indicating "mixed or average reviews".

References

External links

	

2020s American drama television miniseries
2022 American television series debuts
2022 American television series endings
Alternate history television series
Dystopian television series
English-language television shows
HBO Max original programming
Television series by Warner Bros. Television Studios
Television shows based on DC Comics
Television shows set in New York City
Triad (organized crime)
Second American Civil War speculative fiction